Paddy McGroarty is a former England women's international footballer.

International career

Paddy McGroarty made her first appearance for England against Scotland on 18 November 1972, winning England's 3–2 victory.

McGroarty played for Queen's Park Rangers L.F.C. in each of their FA Women's Cup finals and scored in the 1975/76 final.

Honors
 QPR
 FA Women's Cup: 1976–77

References

1946 births
Living people
English people of Irish descent
English women's footballers
England women's international footballers
Women's association footballers not categorized by position